Justin Baesman (born June 3, 1981) is an American professional mixed martial artist currently competing in the Welterweight division. A professional competitor since 2008, he has competed for Bellator, the World Series of Fighting, Tachi Palace Fights, and King of the Cage.

Mixed martial arts career

Early career
Baesman began training in mixed martial arts in 2004 and held an undefeated amateur record of 3-0 before turning professional. Baesman compiled a professional record of 14–3, winning the Gladiator Challenge Middleweight Championship along the way, before signing with Bellator.

Bellator
Baesman made his promotional debut against Brent Weedman at Bellator 100 on September 20, 2013 in the Bellator Season Nine Welterweight Tournament Quarterfinal. Baesman was defeated in the first round via armbar submission.

Baesman made his next appearance against Herman Terrado at Bellator 115 on April 4, 2014. The fight was ruled a draw.

Baesman then faced Andrey Koreshkov at Bellator 118 on May 2, 2014. Baesman was defeated in the first round after he was knocked out by a flying knee, the first knockout loss of his career.

Baesman made his next appearance at Bellator 127 against John Mercurio on October 3, 2014. Baesman won via split decision.

Bare knuckle boxing
Baesman made his debut for Bare Knuckle Fighting Championshipon April 6, 2019. He faced Chris Leben in the show's co-main event. Baesman lost the fight via knockout 25 seconds into the first round.

Personal life
Baesman is married and has two daughters.

Championships and accomplishments
Gladiator Challenge
Gladiator Challenge Welterweight Championship (One time)
Global Knockout
GKO Middleweight Championship (One time)

Mixed martial arts record

|-
|  Loss
| align=center| 22–23–1
|Dakota Cochrane
|Submission (arm-triangle choke) 
|DCS 77
|
|align=center|2
|align=center|3:52
|Omaha, Nebraska, United States
|
|-
|  Win
| align=center| 22–22–1
| Daniel McWilliams
| TKO (punches)
| NWFA 1: Retribution
| 
| align=center| 2
| align=center| 4:23
|Bentonville, Arkansas, United States
| 
|-
|  Win
| align=center| 21–22–1
| Aaron Hedrick
| KO (body kick and punches)
| KOTC: Return to Order
| 
| align=center| 1
| align=center| 0:42
| Oroville, California, United States
|
|-
|  Win
| align=center| 20–22–1
| Chris Ensley
| Submission (guillotine choke)
| High Desert Brawl 14
| 
| align=center| 1
| align=center| 1:21
| Susanville, California, United States
|
|-
|  Loss
| align=center| 19–22–1
| Randall Wallace
| TKO (punches)
| Global Knockout 13
| 
| align=center| 1
| align=center| 3:43
| Jackson, California, United States
|
|-
|  Loss
| align=center| 19–21–1
| Keith Berry
| TKO (punches)
| Gladiator Challenge: Berry vs. Baesman
| 
| align=center| 1
| align=center| 1:31
| Hemet, California, United States
|
|-
|  Loss
| align=center| 19–20–1
| Mikey Gonzalez
| Decision (unanimous)
| Dragon House 30
| 
| align=center| 3
| align=center| 5:00
| San Francisco, California, United States
|
|-
|  Loss
| align=center| 19–19–1
| Mikey Gonzalez
| TKO (punches)
| Dragon House 29
| 
| align=center| 1
| align=center| 3:35
| San Francisco, California, United States
|
|-
|  Loss
| align=center| 19–18–1
| Mike Jasper
| TKO (punches)
| CXF 12: Burbank Beatdown
| 
| align=center| 1
| align=center| 4:57
| Burbank, California, United States
| 
|-
|  Loss
| align=center| 19–17–1
| Angelo Trevino
| Decision (unanimous)
| KOTC: No Escape
| 
| align=center| 3
| align=center| 5:00
| Oroville, California, United States
|
|-
|  Loss
| align=center| 19–16–1
| Daniel Rodriguez
| TKO (punches)
| CXF 11: Alpha Dog
| 
| align=center| 2
| align=center| 1:17
| Studio City, California, United States
|
|-
|  Loss
| align=center| 19–15–1
| Aaron Hedrick
| Decision (unanimous)
| KOTC: Last Stand
| 
| align=center| 3
| align=center| 5:00
| Oroville, California, United States
|Returned to Welterweight.
|-
|  Loss
| align=center| 19–14–1
| Brandon Hester
| Submission (rear-naked choke)
| Global Knockout 10
| 
| align=center| 1
| align=center| 1:48
| Jackson, California, United States
|
|-
|  Loss
| align=center| 19–13–1
| Ben Egli
| Submission (rear-naked choke)
| KOTC: Headstrong
| 
| align=center| 1
| align=center| 3:08
| Lincoln City, Oregon, United States
|For KOTC Welterweight Championship.
|-
|  Loss
| align=center| 19–12–1
| Angel DeAnda
| TKO (punches)
| Global Knockout 9
| 
| align=center| 3
| align=center| 3:20
| Jackson, California, United States
| 
|-
|  Loss
| align=center| 19–11–1
| James Terry
| Decision (unanimous)
| Bellator 165
| 
| align=center| 3
| align=center| 5:00
| San Jose, California, United States
| 
|-
|  Loss
| align=center| 19–10–1
| Mauricio Alonso
| Decision (unanimous)
| Dragon House 23
| 
| align=center| 3
| align=center| 5:00
| San Francisco, California, United States
|For vacant Dragon House Middleweight Championship.
|-
|  Loss
| align=center| 19–9–1
| Angel DeAnda
| TKO (punches)
| Tachi Palace Fights 27
| 
| align=center| 2
| align=center| 1:54
| Lemoore, California, United States
|
|-
|  Win
| align=center| 19–8–1
| Nicolas Kohring
| Decision (unanimous)
| Global Knockout 6
| 
| align=center| 5
| align=center| 5:00
| Jackson, California, United States
| 
|-
|  Win
| align=center| 18–8–1
| Scott Smith
| TKO (punches)
| WFC 16: King of Sacramento
| 
| align=center| 2
| align=center| 0:57
| Sacramento, California, United States
| 
|-
| Win
| align=center| 17–8–1
| Nicolas Kohring
| Decision (split)
| Global Knockout 5
| 
| align=center| 5
| align=center| 5:00
| Jackson, California, United States
| 
|-
| Loss
| align=center| 16–8–1
| Randall Wallace
| Decision (split)
| Global Knockout 4
| 
| align=center| 3
| align=center| 5:00
| Jackson, California, United States
| 
|-
| Loss
| align=center| 16–7–1
| Randall Wallace
| TKO (punches)
| Global Knockout 3
| 
| align=center| 1
| align=center| 2:00
| Jackson, California, United States
| 
|-
| Win
| align=center| 16–6–1
| Randall Wallace
| Decision (split)
| WCF 13: Huckaba vs. Mitchell
| 
| align=center| 3
| align=center| 5:00
| Sacramento, California, United States
| 
|-
| Loss
| align=center| 15–6–1
| David Mitchell
| Submission (rear-naked choke)
| WSOF 16
| 
| align=center| 1
| align=center| 1:44
| Sacramento, California, United States
| 
|-
| Win
| align=center| 15–5–1
| John Mercurio
| Decision (split)
| Bellator 127
| 
| align=center| 3
| align=center| 5:00
| Temecula, California, United States
| 
|-
| Loss
| align=center| 14–5–1
| Andrey Koreshkov
| KO (flying knee)
| Bellator 118
| 
| align=center| 1
| align=center| 1:41
| Atlantic City, New Jersey, United States
| 
|-
| Draw
| align=center| 14–4–1
| Herman Terrado
| Draw (majority)
| Bellator 115
| 
| align=center| 3
| align=center| 5:00
| Reno, Nevada, United States
| 
|-
| Loss
| align=center| 14–4
| Brent Weedman
| Submission (armbar)
| Bellator 100
| 
| align=center| 1
| align=center| 3:20
| Phoenix, Arizona, United States
| 
|-
| Win
| align=center| 14–3
| Daniel Roberts
| Decision (split)
| War MMA 1: Roberts vs. Baesman
| 
| align=center| 3
| align=center| 5:00
| Stockton, California, United States
| 
|-
| Win
| align=center| 13–3
| Robert Sarkozi
| Decision (split)
| Gladiator Challenge: American Dream
| 
| align=center| 3
| align=center| 3:00
| Lincoln, California, United States
| 
|-
| Win
| align=center| 12–3
| Mikhail Venikov
| Submission (rear-naked choke)
| WFC 5: Andrews vs. Griffin
| 
| align=center| 2
| align=center| 2:43
| Sacramento, California, United States
| 
|-
| Win
| align=center| 11–3
| Tony Johnson
| Decision (split)
| DH: Dragon House 13
| 
| align=center| 3
| align=center| 5:00
| Oakland, California, United States
| 
|-
| Loss
| align=center| 10–3
| Kito Andrews
| Submission (strikes)
| WFC: Resolution
| 
| align=center| 1
| align=center| 1:36
| Yuba City, California, United States
| 
|-
| Win
| align=center| 10–2
| Max Griffin
| Decision (split)
| WFC: Showdown
| 
| align=center| 5
| align=center| 5:00
| Yuba City, California, United States
| 
|-
| Win
| align=center| 9–2
| Jaime Jara
| Decision (unanimous)
| KOTC: All In
| 
| align=center| 3
| align=center| 5:00
| Oroville, California, United States
| 
|-
| Win
| align=center| 8–2
| Jack Montgomery
| TKO (punches)
| Gladiator Challenge: Justified
| 
| align=center| 1
| align=center| 2:36
| Elko, Nevada, United States
| 
|-
| Win
| align=center| 7–2
| Jeff Morris
| TKO (punches)
| Gladiator Challenge: Mega Stars
| 
| align=center| 1
| align=center| N/A
| Lincoln, California, United States
| 
|-
| Loss
| align=center| 6–2
| Lewis Gonzalez
| Submission (strikes)
| KOTC: Cage Quest
| 
| align=center| 1
| align=center| 2:00
| Oroville, California, United States
| 
|-
| Win
| align=center| 6–1
| Carlos Canez
| Submission
| Gladiator Challenge: Unleashed
| 
| align=center| 2
| align=center| N/A
| Lincoln, California, United States
| 
|-
| Loss
| align=center| 5–1
| Jaime Jara
| Submission (rear-naked choke)
| Gladiator Challenge: Warpath
| 
| align=center| 2
| align=center| 3:32
| Placerville, California, United States
| 
|-
| Win
| align=center| 5–0
| Jack Montgomery
| TKO (punches)
| Gladiator Challenge: High Octane
| 
| align=center| 2
| align=center| 0:25
| Placerville, California, United States
| 
|-
| Win
| align=center| 4–0
| Kyle Bledsoe
| TKO (punches)
| Gladiator Challenge: Impulse
| 
| align=center| 1
| align=center| 2:59
| Placerville, California, United States
| 
|-
| Win
| align=center| 3–0
| Daniel Schmitt
| Decision (unanimous)
| URC 3: Ultimate Reno Combat 3
| 
| align=center| 3
| align=center| 5:00
| Reno, Nevada, United States
| 
|-
| Win
| align=center| 2–0
| Sean Neeley
| Submission (rear-naked choke)
| URC 2: Ultimate Reno Combat 2
| 
| align=center| 2
| align=center| 4:05
| Reno, Nevada, United States
| 
|-
| Win
| align=center| 1–0
| Jose Rico
| Decision (unanimous)
| EWC 4: Welterweight War
| 
| align=center| 3
| align=center| 5:00
| Salem, Oregon, United States
|

Kickboxing record

Bareknuckle boxing record

|Loss
|align=center|0-1
|Chris Leben
|KO (punches)
|Bare Knuckle FC 5
|
|align=center|1
|align=center|0:25
|Biloxi, Mississippi, United States
|
|-

References

External links

1981 births
Living people
American male mixed martial artists
Mixed martial artists from California
Welterweight mixed martial artists
Mixed martial artists utilizing boxing
Mixed martial artists utilizing kickboxing
American male boxers
Bare-knuckle boxers 
Boxers from California
American male kickboxers
Kickboxers from California
People from Pittsburg, California
People from Susanville, California